Hygrocybe astatogala is a mushroom of the waxcap genus Hygrocybe. Found in Australia and New Zealand, it was first described scientifically as Bertrandia astatogala by French mycologist Roger Heim in 1936. Paul Heinemann transferred it to Hygrocybe in 1963.

References

External links

Fungi described in 1936
Fungi of Australia
Fungi of New Zealand
astatogala